The West African University Games, also known as the ECOWAS Students Games, is a multi-sport event between student-athletes from West African universities. The competition was first held in 1965 in Ibadan, Nigeria, and has been held on a roughly once ever four to six years since 1989. 

The idea for the competition emerged from a conference of West African universities in 1964 in Ibadan.

The last edition to be held was the 14th at the University of Port Harcourt in Nigeria, lasting from 31 October to 12 November 2018. The 13th edition of the games in 2012 involved 1,443 athletes from 56 West African Universities (6 non-competing) from 5 West African nations. A total of 13 Olympic sports were contested.

Editions

Sports

References

African international sports competitions
Sport in West Africa
Multi-sport events in Africa
Recurring sporting events established in 1965
1965 establishments in Nigeria